Michael Patrick Heeney is an American country music songwriter. He has co-written singles for several country music recording artists, including hit singles for Brooks & Dunn ("God Must Be Busy"), Eric Church ("Love Your Love the Most" and "Drink in My Hand"), George Jones ("Still Doin' Time"), Tracy Byrd ("Ten Rounds with José Cuervo"), and Reba McEntire ("Have I Got a Deal for You")

Biography
Heeney grew up in an Irish neighborhood in Chicago, IL and moved to Nashville in 1974 to pursue a degree in Recording Industry Management at Middle Tennessee State University.  Heeney has been a writer at Sony-ATV-Tree since 1995

Singles

Album Cuts

References

American country songwriters
American male songwriters
1955 births
Living people
People from Nashville, Tennessee
Songwriters from Tennessee